The 41st government of Turkey (21 July 1977 – 5 January 1978) was a historical government of Turkey. It is also called the fifth Demirel cabinet and Second Nationalist Front.

Background 
After the 40th government failed to receive the vote of confidence, three parties formed a coalition and named their government the "Second Nationalist Front." The prime minister was Süleyman Demirel, the leader of Justice Party (AP). Other partners were National Salvation Party (MSP) and Nationalist Movement Party (MHP). The difference between the first and the second nationalistic fronts was that Republican Reliance Party (CGP) was no longer a partner of the coalition.

The government
In the list below, the serving period of cabinet members who served only a part of the cabinet's lifespan are shown in the column "Notes".

Aftermath
The government was short-lived. The Republican People's Party overthrew the government by interpellation.

References

Cabinets of Turkey
Cabinets established in 1977
Cabinets disestablished in 1978
Coalition governments of Turkey
Justice Party (Turkey)
Members of the 41st government of Turkey
1977 establishments in Turkey
1978 disestablishments in Turkey
16th parliament of Turkey